Florida's 27th congressional district is an electoral district for the U.S. Congress and was first created in South Florida during 2012, effective January 2013, as a result of the 2010 Census. The first candidates ran in the 2012 House elections, and the winner was seated for the 113th Congress on January 3, 2013.

The 27th district is located entirely within Miami-Dade County. The district includes parts of Miami south of the Dolphin Expressway, including Downtown and Little Havana, Coral Gables, and Kendall. In the 2020 redistricting cycle, Miami Beach was drawn out of the district and into the 24th district, while several places in unincorporated Miami-Dade County, such as Palmetto Estates and parts of Fontainebleau and Westchester were drawn into the 27th district.

The district is currently represented by Republican Maria Elvira Salazar, serving since January 12, 2021. She was first elected in 2020 after defeating Representative Donna Shalala in a rematch of the 2018 race.

List of members representing the district

Election results

2012

2014 
Ileana Ros-Lehtinen ran unopposed.

2016

2018

2020

2022

References

External links

27
Constituencies established in 2013
2013 establishments in Florida